Rainer Nõlvak (born September 28, 1966) is an Estonian entrepreneur and nature protector who is the Chairman of the Board of the Estonian Nature Fund.

Rainer Nõlvak has advocated for the Estonian energy industry to move away from oil shale
and move towards renewable energy systems. He has published the "Green Energy" program.

He was among the organizers of Let's Do It 2008, a civic action with 50,000 volunteers participating in cleaning up the countryside of Estonia in one day. Because of this he received the 2008 Estonian Volunteer of the Year national award. The movement has initiated the global Let's Do It! World action.

He founded the following companies: Microlink Baltics, Curonia Research, Celecure.

He was awarded the title of Citizen of the Year in 2008 and the Order of the White Star 3rd Class of Estonia in 2014.

References

External links
 

Estonian businesspeople
Living people
Estonian environmentalists
Recipients of the Order of the White Star, 3rd Class
1966 births